Joseph Blowick (13 March 1903 – 12 August 1970) was an Irish Clann na Talmhan politician who served as Minister for Lands from 1948 to 1951 and 1954 to 1957 and Leader of Clann na Talmhan from 1944 to 1965. He served as a Teachta Dála (TD) for the Mayo South constituency from 1943 to 1965.

Family
Blowick was born in Belcarra, County Mayo, on 13 March 1903, the son of John Blowick (a farmer) and Honoria "Norah" (née Madden) Blowick. He had two sisters, and four brothers, three of whom became priests: Stephen Blowick, John Blowick and Peter Blowick.

He attended the local national school and later worked on his father's large farm, going on to inherit it, as his other brothers were all in Holy orders.

In January 1956, aged 53, Blowick married nineteen-year-old Teresa O'Malley of Castleburke, County Mayo. They had four sons and three daughters.

Political career
Blowock's first political office was as a member of Mayo County Council.

He was first elected to Dáil Éireann in 1943 as a Clann na Talmhan TD for Mayo South, one of ten seats the party took across the state and one of the two seats in County Mayo. He succeeded Michael Donnellan as leader of the party in 1944. 

The party's representation dropped to seven seats after the 1948 general election but it was strong enough to be part of a coalition arrangement and Blowick was appointed to the Cabinet in the two Inter-Party governments (1948–1951, 1954–1957), serving under John A. Costello as Minister for Lands on both occasions. 

Blowick was re-elected to the Dáil at every election until 1965 when he retired from politics.

He died on 12 August 1970 in a Dublin hospital, leaving an estate valued at £9,771.

References

 

1903 births
1970 deaths
Clann na Talmhan TDs
Members of the 11th Dáil
Members of the 12th Dáil
Members of the 13th Dáil
Members of the 14th Dáil
Members of the 15th Dáil
Members of the 16th Dáil
Members of the 17th Dáil
20th-century Irish farmers
Presidential appointees to the Council of State (Ireland)